is a Japanese actor. He graduated from Tokyo Gakkan High School and Tokyo University of Agriculture. He is represented by Papado.

Biography

Kudo's father is professional baseball player and Fukuoka SoftBank Hawks coach Kimiyasu Kudo, and his sister is professional golfer Haruka Kudo. He is the first and eldest child of five siblings. Kudo had played tennis himself, but had no experience on professional baseball.

His acting debut was the Nippon TV drama Perfect Son in 2012. In 2013, he appeared in the NHK Taiga drama Yae's Sakura as Yamamoto Yaeko's younger brother Yamamoto Saburō, and later from July to September he appeared in the Fuji Television drama Shomuni 2013.

He later played pitcher Kazuya Okihara in the Tokyo Broadcasting System Nichiyō Gekijō series Roosevelt Game in 2014. Kudo was chosen from the audition from about a hundred applicants, and played as the same position as his father. Later in the 24 May between the Saitama Seibu Lions and the Tokyo Yakult Swallows in Seibu Prince Dome he wore the Seibu Lions uniform number 47, the same as his father's, and went to the ceremonial first pitch. Kudoh played a gay lover in the Nippon TV drama Fake Marriage.

Awards

 24th Japanese Movie Critics Awards Newcomer Award for Best Actor (Toshiko Minami Award) (1/11: Jūichibun no Ichi, Momose, Kocchi o Muite.)

Filmography

TV drama

Films

Advertisements

Notes

References

21st-century Japanese male actors
Tokyo University of Agriculture alumni
Actors from Saitama Prefecture
1991 births
Living people